Robu is a Romanian surname. Notable people with the surname include:

Doina Robu (born 1967), Romanian rower
Ioan Robu (born 1944), Romanian Catholic prelate
Mihai Robu (1884–1944), Romanian cleric
Nicolae Robu, Romanian politician
Valentin Robu, Romanian rower

Romanian-language surnames